In the United States, a redistricting commission is a body, other than the usual state legislative bodies, established to draw electoral district boundaries. Generally the intent is to avoid gerrymandering, or at least the appearance of gerrymandering, by specifying a nonpartisan or bipartisan body to comprise the commission drawing district boundaries.

Nonpartisan or bipartisan commissions as of 2010
Currently, 21 U.S. states have some form of non-partisan or bipartisan redistricting commission. Of these 21 states, 13 use redistricting commissions to exclusively draw electoral district boundaries (see below). A 14th state, Iowa, uses a special redistricting process that uses neither the state legislature nor an independent redistricting commission to draw electoral district boundaries (see below).

In 2015, the U.S. Supreme Court ruled in Arizona State Legislature v. Arizona Independent Redistricting Commission that redistricting commissions such as Arizona's, whose redistricting commission process is independent of the state legislature, were constitutional.

Table key
For purposes of these tables:
 Bipartisan means a substantial majority of the commission's membership is reserved for members of the two major U.S. political parties. 
 Non-partisan means that either, a) the partisan makeup of the commission is not specified beforehand, or b) a substantial portion (i.e. more than one) of the membership of the commission is reserved for political independents or members of so-called third parties.

Iowa is a special case:

Additionally, Maine and Vermont use advisory committees for redistricting. Connecticut, Illinois, Mississippi, Oklahoma, and Texas have backup redistricting commissions, if efforts at redistricting via the usual legislative process fail.

2021 redistricting
In 2021, following the 2020 census, a number of states will begin using new, non-partisan commissions or systems to redraw their legislative and/or congressional districts

See also
 Redistricting
 Boundary commissions (United Kingdom), four bodies in the United Kingdom having equivalent function to state redistricting commissions

References

Redistricting in the United States